Nyctocalos is a genus of flowering plants belonging to the family Bignoniaceae.

Its native range is South-Central China to Malesia.

Species
Species:

Nyctocalos brunfelsiiflorum 
Nyctocalos cuspidatum 
Nyctocalos pinnatum 
Nyctocalos shanica

References

Bignoniaceae
Bignoniaceae genera